The Clube Ferroviário de Luanda (in English: Railway Club Luanda) is an Angolan basketball team based in Luanda. It is the basketball section of the multi-sports club with the same name.

In the past, they have also played in Angolan Basketball League, winning the national title in 1979. While the club has currently not been involved in any official competitions at the senior level, Clube Ferroviário is one of the most traditional clubs in Luanda and the one to have won the first national basketball championship after the country's independence.

Honours 
Angolan National Championship:
Winner (1): 1978–79

Chairman history
 1981–1985 Francisco de Almeida
 1985–1988 Feliciano Pedrosa
 1988–1995 António Agante
 1996–2005 Sílvio Vinhas
 2005–2012 Abel Cosme
 2013–2016 Bráulio de Brito
 2017–pres Jorge Abreu

Rosters

1985 Squad

See also
Ferroviário de Luanda Handball
Federação Angolana de Basquetebol

References

Sports clubs in Angola
Basketball teams in Angola
1909 establishments in Africa
Basketball teams established in 1909